The Kingdom of Larantuka was a historical monarchy in present-day East Nusa Tenggara, Indonesia. It was the one of the few, if not the only, indigenous Catholic polities in the territory of modern Indonesia. Acting as a tributary state of the Portuguese Crown, the Raja (King) of Larantuka controlled holdings on the islands of Flores, Solor, Adonara and Lembata. It was later purchased by Dutch East Indies from the Portuguese, prior to its annexation in 1904.

Despite losing its effective sovereignty after the annexation, the Kingdom's royal family persisted as traditional figureheads prior to the final abolition of the royal structure by republican authorities in 1962.

History

Monarchs of the Larantuka Kingdom claim descent from a union between a man from the Kingdom of Manuaman Lakaan Fialaran or Wehale Waiwuku in South Timor and a mythical woman from a nearby extinct volcano of Ile Mandiri. Traditional belief systems and rituals of the Lamaholot people who were their subjects place the rajas in a central role, especially for those who adhered to traditional beliefs.

In the Javanese Negarakertagama, the locations Galiyao and Solot were mentioned to be "east of Bali" and are believed to correspond to the approximate region, indicating some form of contact from tributary relations or trading between the region and the Majapahit Empire, due to its location in the trade routes carrying sandalwood from nearby Timor. Influences from the powerful Ternate Sultanate were also believed to be present.

Western presence in the region started with the Portuguese, who captured Malacca in 1511. As they began trading for the sandalwood at Timor, their presence in the region increased. Solor was described by Tomé Pires in his Suma Oriental, although some scholars believe he was referring to nearby larger Flores, mentioning the abundance of exported sulphur and foodstuffs. By 1515, there was trade between both Flores and Solor with the foreigners, and by 1520 a small Portuguese settlement had been constructed in Lifau, at Solor. The Portuguese traders were in conflict with the Dominicans in Solor, because they were more interested in trade than in Christianization. The trade in sandalwood also attracted Chinese and Dutch along with nearer Makassarese, creating competition. This competition forced the Portuguese traders to leave Solor and settle in Larantuka, briefly before 1600. The Makassarese attacked and captured Larantuka in 1541 to extend their control over the sandalwood trade and in 1613, the Dutch destroyed the Portuguese base at Solor before establishing themselves at modern Kupang. With the occupation of Solor and the Dominicans moved to Larantuka.
Two waves of immigration brought additional population. As the Dutch conquered Malacca in 1641, many Portuguese moved to Larantuka. Two villages, Wureh and Konga, accommodated the new arrivals. As the Dutch attacked Makassar in 1660, most of the Portuguese from there also came to Larantuka.
The Portuguese took indigenous wives, but they always wrote down the Portuguese ancestry. This new population group was called Topasses, but they called themselves Larantuqueiros (inhabitants of Larantuka). The Dutch called them Zwarte Portugeesen  ("black Portuguese").
 
The Larantuqueiros turned out a loose, but mighty power in the region, which influence reached far beyond the settlement. The core cell was the federation of Larantuka, Wureh and Konga. Theoretically they were subordinated to Portugal. But in practice they were free. They had no Portuguese administration and they did not pay taxes. Letters of the Lisbon government were ignored. For long years there was a bloody struggle for power between the families da Costa and de Hornay. At the end they shared the power. The Larantuqueiros made "alliances" with the indigenous people of Flores and Timor.

They followed a certain strategy; the most notable Raja Ola Adobala who was brought up under Portuguese education, traditionally the ninth in the pedigree of the Rajas was converted to Catholicism and baptized during the reign of Peter II of Portugal (while present-day traditional celebrations place his baptism at 1650 instead), by military pressure. He had to take an oath of allegiance to the king of Portugal and there on the title Dom was granted to him. The raja was allowed to rule his folk autonomously, but in war he had to supply auxiliary forces. In addition, Portuguese sources mention a Dom Constantino between 1625–1661, which implies that Adobala may not be the first in the line of Catholic monarchs of Larantuka. Other monarch names mentioned are Dom Luis (1675) and Dom Domingos Viera (1702) The Dominican Order was vital in the spread of Catholicism in the area until their later replacement in the 19th century.

The polity maintained some form of a closed-port policy for outsiders in the late 17th century. There were also some interactions with the nearby Bima Sultanate, whose Sultan enforced his suzerainty over parts of Western Flores in 1685. Territories of the kingdom were not contiguous and was interspersed by the holdings of several lesser polities, some of which were Muslim. They also established Portuguese as the official language to distance themselves from the natives. The language of commerce was the Malay language, which was understood on the surrounding islands.

By 1851, debts incurred by the Portuguese colony in East Timor motivated the Portuguese authorities to "sell" territories covered by Larantuka to the Dutch East Indies, and the transfer was made by 1859 ceding the Portuguese claim/suzerainty over parts of Flores and the island range stretching from Alor to Solor for 200,000 florins and some Dutch holdings in Timor. The treaty also confirmed that the Catholic inhabitants of the region will remain so under the authority of Protestant Netherlands, and the Dutch authorities sent Jesuit priests to the area so they could engage in missionary works, starting in Larantuka with the building of the first rectory. They reintroduced a more orthodox form of Catholicism to the region. Monogamy was reinforced due their influence. The missionaries built Catholic schools and brought health care.

The Dutch sent a military and administrative officer, who took residence in a small fort, but they did not influence much of the population.
Since Larantuka offered little promise, after the downturn of the sandalwood trade. The locals resorted to farming as not much was left of the former profitable foreign trade.

On 14 September 1887, a new Raja Dom Lorenzo Diaz Vieria Godinho ascended to the throne as Lorenzo II, who was educated by Jesuit priests. Showing clear traits of independence, he attempted to extract taxes from territories belonging to a nearby Raja of Sikka, led groups of men to intervene in local conflicts, and refused to conduct sacrifices in the manner his predecessors did for the non-Catholic natives. Eventually, colonial authorities responded by deposing and exiling him to Java in 1904, where he died six years later.

With the independence of Indonesia the Larantuqueiros gained new influence. They were able to reach leading positions, because they had a higher level of education than then natives. Even the Indonesian language, which became the new official language, was easy for them, because it is very similar to the Malay language. The royal family remained post-Indonesian independence as traditional figureheads with no legal authority until their final abolishment on 1962.

Legacy

In present-day Indonesia, unique Catholic traditions close to Easter days remain, locally known as the Semana Santa. It involves a procession carrying statues of Jesus and Virgin Mary (locally referred to as Tuan Ana and Tuan Ma) to a local beach, then to Cathedral of the Queen of the Rosary, the seat of the bishop. The raja title is still held by descendants of the past kings (most recently by Don Andre III Marthinus DVG on 2016), although it is not associated with any secular authority. The residence (istana) of the king still stands to this day.

According to the 2010 census, the majority of the population in the kingdom's former territories, and the East Nusa Tenggara province as a whole, remained Catholics.

See also
 Portuguese colonialism in Indonesia
 History of Christianity in Indonesia
Christianity in Indonesia

References

Former countries in Indonesian history
States and territories established in the 16th century
Ancient history
States and territories disestablished in the 20th century
Larantuka